Stigmella ulmivora is a moth of the family Nepticulidae. It is found in all of Europe, except the Balkan Peninsula.

Description
The thick erect hairs on the head vertex are black. The collar is black. Antennal eyecaps are white. The forewings are shining dark coppery-golden, costa deep purple; a shining silvery fascia beyond middle; apical area beyond this deep purple-fuscous. Hindwings are rather dark. External image

Adults are usually on wing in May in one generation, but there might be a second generation depending on the location.

Ecology
The larvae feed on Ulmus glabra, Ulmus laevis, Ulmus minor and Ulmus pumila. They mine the leaves of their host plant. The mine consists of a slender corridor. In the first segment, the frass is concentrated in a narrow central line. The frass pattern in the later segment is very variable, ranging from a narrow central line to broadly dispersed or even coiled.

References

External links
Bestimmungshilfe für die in Europa nachgewiesenen Schmetterlingsarten
Swedish Moths

Nepticulidae
Moths described in 1860
Moths of Europe
Taxa named by Egide Fologne